"Wouldn't Believe It" is the first single from The Get Up Kids' album Guilt Show. The single was only released in Japan.

Track listing

Additional releases
"Martyr Me" was released on the band's fourth album Guilt Show, as well as their live album Live! @ The Granada Theater.
"Wouldn't Believe It" was released on the band's fourth album, Guilt Show.
The acoustic versions of "I'll Catch You" and "Wish You Were Here" were released on a secret online site that could only be accessed by putting the Enhanced CD version of Guilt Show into a CD-Rom drive.

Personnel
Matt Pryor - Vocals, guitar
Jim Suptic - Guitar, Backing vocals
Rob Pope - Bass
Ryan Pope - Drums
James Dewees - Keyboard
Ed Rose - Producer

Notes

2002 singles
The Get Up Kids songs
2002 songs